Charles Wilson Vincent FRSE FIC FCS (1837–1905) was a 19th-century British chemist, and was also librarian at both the Royal Institution and the Reform Club in London. He was a Sandemanian.

Life
He was born in Islington in London on 11 May 1837 the eldest of 12 children of Benjamin Vincent (1818-1899), a colleague of Michael Faraday, and his wife Janey Young. He was baptised in Clerkenwell on 16 June. Benjamin became a Sandemanian at the influence of Faraday in 1832.

He joined the Royal Institution in 1851 as Assistant Librarian, under his father as Librarian. Aged 14 his role presumably was that of a trainee or apprentice. A second son Robert Vincent also joined as second assistant. Charles began lecturing at the Royal College of Chemistry in 1854 (aged only 17).

He resigned as Librarian of the Royal Institution in 1857 to join the chemical industry.

He became a member of the Sandemanian Church in 1859 but resigned in 1864.

In 1875 he was elected a Fellow of the Royal Society of Edinburgh for his contributions to chemistry. His proposers were Andrew Pritchard, William Rutherford, George James Allman and John Hutton Balfour.

He became librarian to the Reform Club in 1879, replacing Henry Campkin.

He died on 11 September 1905 in Stoke Newington.

Publications

On the Sulphur Deposits of Krlsuvik, Iceland (1873)
The Yearbook of Facts in Science and Art (from 1855 to 1876)
Burton Brewing Water (1878)
Chemistry: Theoretical, Practical and Analytical (1879)

Family

He was married to Ann or Anne Ross Baxter in 1864 at Islington Registry Office. They had a truly remarkable 20 children.

One of his sisters was named Sarah Faraday Vincent in honour of Faraday.

References

1837 births
1905 deaths
People from the London Borough of Islington
English chemists
English non-fiction writers
English librarians
Fellows of the Royal Society of Edinburgh